Keegan Ritchie (born 3 July 1990) is a South African football player who plays as a defender for South African Premier Division club Maritzburg United F.C.

References

External links
 

1990 births
Living people
South African soccer players
Association football defenders
People from Alberton, Gauteng
Sportspeople from Gauteng
White South African people
Moroka Swallows F.C. players
SK Slavia Prague players
Kaizer Chiefs F.C. players
Bloemfontein Celtic F.C. players
SuperSport United F.C. players
Bidvest Wits F.C. players
South African Premier Division players
Czech First League players
South African expatriate soccer players
Expatriate footballers in the Czech Republic
South African expatriate sportspeople in the Czech Republic
Lusitano F.C. (South Africa) players